Hrádek is a town in Rokycany District in the Plzeň Region of the Czech Republic. It has about 2,700 inhabitants. It is an industrial centre.

Administrative parts

The village of Nová Huť is an administrative part of Hrádek.

Geography
Most of the municipal territory lies in the Švihov Highlands.

Hrádek is situated in the valley of the Klabava River. It lies in a plateau on the left bank of the river. Hrádek together with Rokycany and Kamenný Újezd forms a contiguous built-up area along the Klabava River.

History
The first written mention of Hrádek is from 1325, when King John of Bohemia donated Hrádek to Petr of Rosenberg. The village of Nová Huť (lit. "New Smelter") gained its name in 1854.

Since Middle Ages the Klabava valley region specialized in iron ore mining and iron production. This industrial aspect was further strengthened in the 20th century when both communities (Hrádek and Nová Huť) formed functionally one settlement with their economy centered around the Hrádecké železárny ironworks. Later both villages merged into one municipality.

After World War II, local steelworks have expanded filling most of the area along the Klabava river. These investments were accompanied by massive residential construction that completely transformed Hrádek. New housing project grew in area between old Hrádek and Nová Huť villages covering the plateau south of Klabava river. Architecture of earlier stages of this new tenement houses district was inspired by Socialist realism. Main axis of new Hrádek is a wide avenue (1. máje Street) leading from Nová Huť to the southeast where it ends on the central square (9. května Square) with community centre, department store and other public facilities. Rapid population growth followed and Hrádek acquired urban character. In 1970, Hrádek was promoted to a town.

Demographics

Economy
After 1989, Hrádecké železárny ironworks went through transformation. In 1996, it became part of Z-Group Steel Holding company.

In 1998, Borgers company opened new factory in the town. It produces textile components for automotive industry.

Transport
Hrádek lies on the railway line of local importance leading from Rokycany to Mirošov.

Notable people
Vladimír Jirásek (1933–2018), slalom canoeist

References

External links

Cities and towns in the Czech Republic
Populated places in Rokycany District